The 2013 Internationaux de Tennis de Vendée is a professional tennis tournament played on hard courts. It is the first edition of the tournament which was part of the 2013 ATP Challenger Tour. It is taking place in Mouilleron-le-Captif, France between 14 and 20 October 2013.

Singles main-draw entrants

Seeds

 1 Rankings are as of September 30, 2013.

Other entrants
The following players received wildcards into the singles main draw:
  Michaël Llodra
  Hugo Nys
  Lucas Pouille
  Maxime Teixeira

The following players received entry from the qualifying draw:
  Andrés Artunedo Martinavarr
  Stéphane Bohli
  Andrej Martin
  Tim Puetz

The following players received entry as a Lucky Loser:
  Vincent Millot

Champions

Singles

 Michael Berrer def.  Nicolas Mahut 1–6, 6–4, 6–3

Doubles

 Fabrice Martin /  Hugo Nys def.  Henri Kontinen /  Adrián Menéndez Maceiras 3–6, 6–3, [10–8]

External links
Official website

Internationaux de Tennis de Vendee
Internationaux de Tennis de Vendée